β-Zearalenol is a nonsteroidal estrogen of the resorcylic acid lactone group related to mycoestrogens found in Fusarium spp. It is the β epimer of α-zearalenol and along with α-zearalenol is a major metabolite of zearalenone formed mainly in the liver but also to a lesser extent in the intestines during first-pass metabolism. A relatively high proportion of α-zearalenol is formed from zearalenone compared to β-zearalenol in humans. β-Zearalenol is about the same or slightly less potent as an estrogen relative to zearalenone.

See also
 Taleranol (β-zearalanol)
 Zeranol (α-zearalanol)
 Zearalanone

References

Lactones
Mycoestrogens
Mycotoxins
Resorcinols